Edward Nevill, de facto 8th (de jure 1st) Baron Bergavenny (c. 1550 – 1 December 1622) was an English peer.

The son of Edward Nevill, 7th Baron Bergavenny, he succeeded to the Barony upon the death of his father. His right to the title was contested by his cousin Mary, Lady Fane, who claimed to be heir general of her father, the 6th Baron. The dispute went on for many years.

He married Rachel Lennard, daughter of John Lennard of Knoll and Elizabeth Harman, together they had the following children:
Henry Nevill, 9th Baron Bergavenny (b. bef. 1580 – 24 December 1641)
Mary Nevill (b. bef. 1598 – 1648)
Sir Christopher Nevill (b. bef. 1611 – 1649) married Mary D'Arcy and had Richard Nevill (d. abt. 1643), who married Sophia Carew. Their son, George Nevill (d. 1665), and his wife, Mary Whitelock, were the parents of George Nevill, 13th Baron Bergavenny and Capt. Edward Nevill (d. 1701). Edward Nevill married Hannah Thorp and had William Nevill, 16th Baron Bergavenny. 
Edward Nevill (b. bef. 1616)
John Nevill (b. bef. 1616)
Thomas Nevill (b. bef. 1616)
Charles Nevill (b. bef. 1616)
Elizabeth Nevill (b. bef. 1590, died after 1648), who married firstly Sir John Grey, eldest son of Henry Grey, 1st Baron Grey of Groby and secondly Sir John Bingley MP (died 1638), Comptroller of the Musters and Cheques for Ireland
Catherine Nevill (b. bef. 1616)
Frances Nevill (b. bef. 1616)
Margaret Nevill (b. bef. 1616)

References

External links 
 
 familysearch.org Accessed 13 June 2007
 thepeerage.com  Accessed 21 February 2008
 stirnet.com Accessed 13 June 2007

1550s births
1622 deaths
Nevill, Edward
17th-century English nobility
Edward
16th-century English nobility
Barons Bergavenny (Peerage of England)